The Ministry of Hajj and Umrah (MHU) is a government ministry in Saudi Arabia which is responsible for supervising the facilitation of essential services to the pilgrims arriving in the country for Hajj and Umrah purposes, including overseeing their secure transportation and movement to the holy cities of Mecca and Medina. 

It mainly coordinates between different sectors working for Hajj and Umrah operations as well as between different Hajj-related agencies in Muslim countries and worldwide. Moreover, the Ministry is responsible for developing plans, implementing and supervising the services provided to pilgrims and visitors of the Two Holy Mosques.

The cities of Mecca and Medina, where Muslims perform Hajj and Umrah, both come under Saudi Arabian jurisdiction.

The Ministry has recently launched an application to issued e-visa for umrah visitors and pilgrims.

The minister of Hajj and Umrah is Tawfig Al-Rabiah succeeding Dr. Issam bin Saad bin Saeed.

Strategic initiatives 
To achieve the strategic goals and targets of vision 2030, the Ministry of Hajj and Umrah launched several strategic initiatives. These initiatives include; the establishment of the electronic control center and system at the Ministry of Hajj and Umrah to provide a control panel for cooperative governmental agencies. Another initiative is introduction of the Hajj pilgrims' e-bracelet program that stores pilgrims information and helps to provide them with the necessary support. The ministry has also increased the capacity of Umrah and hajj where more than 4.1 million visas have been issued in 2019.

In June 2020, following the coronavirus pandemic, the ministry of Hajj and Umrah announced to restrict the number of pilgrims to 10,000. “This decision is taken to ensure Hajj is performed in a safe manner from a public health perspective while observing all preventative measures and the necessary social distancing protocols to protect human beings,” the ministry said in a statement.

The Grand Hajj symposium 

The Grand Hajj symposium is a cultural and scientific meeting held annually in Mecca during the Hajj season. The symposium is organized by the Ministry of Haj and Umra with the participation of scholars, thinkers, Intellectuals, and writers of the Islamic world.

References

External links
Rights of Hajj and Umrah pilgrims

Hajj
Saudi